Pedro Manuel Grosso Pacheco (born 11 June 1986), known as Grosso,  is a retired Portuguese footballer who played as a midfielder.

Career
Born in Santo Tirso, Grosso is a youth prospect of C.D. Aves, arriving as a 9-year-old, and representing them until 2004, when he moved to Académica de Coimbra to finish his youth development.

He wasn't given a contract at Académica, so he returned to Desportivo de Aves, debuting on 7 May 2006,in an away draw against Estoril-Praia, for the 2005–06 Liga de Honra.

In 2006, he was loaned to Leça in the fourth tier, but only made one appearance, returning to Aves in the following season, to become a regular starter.

References

External links

1986 births
Living people
People from Santo Tirso
Portuguese footballers
Association football midfielders
Liga Portugal 2 players
C.D. Aves players
Leça F.C. players
Sportspeople from Porto District